"Last Night in Soho" is a single by English pop band Dave Dee, Dozy, Beaky, Mick & Tich, released by Fontana on 28 June 1968. Written by the band's regular songwriters Ken Howard and Alan Blaikley, it was the follow-up to the chart topper "The Legend of Xanadu" and gave the band their final top-ten placing on the UK Singles Chart, reaching number 8.

Composition
"Last Night in Soho" is described in Colin Larkin's Encyclopedia of Popular Music as "a leather-boy motorbike saga portraying lost innocence in London's most notorious square mile". Songwriters Ken Howard and Alan Blaikley wrote the song with "a strong visual image" in mind, prompted by a comment made by Dave Dee. The duo were keen to write a song about a British city to counter the many famous songs about cities like New York and Paris. In contrast to the exotic themes of the band's previous singles "Zabadak!" and "The Legend of Xanadu", the song is set in Soho, an area in the West End of London renowned for much of the 20th century as a base for the city's sex industry and night life. It concerns an ex-convict who attempts to go straight for the sake of his lover, but succumbs to temptation after reuniting with his hoodlum friends. The final verse finds him heading for a prison sentence and bidding a regretful farewell to his lover. Writer Rob Chapman has described the song as "a psycho-drama set in Gangland" with "a middle eight straight out of Lionel Bart and Joan Littlewood".

The song incorporates a dramatic orchestral arrangement by Reg Tilsley. A detuning hammond organ signifies the arrival of the police. Frontman Dave Dee considered the song more serious than previous hits for his band, telling Disc and Music Echo "Nobody can say that we've made repetitive records in the past. They were gimmicky but always different from each other. But there comes a time when you must progress and try something a little straighter". The song was Dee's favourite of his band's hits.

Release
"Last Night in Soho", backed with the band's own composition "Mrs. Thursday", was released by Fontana on 28 June 1968. The band were photographed with a motorcycle in front of a Soho strip bar in promotion of the single and performed it on the 4 July edition of Top of the Pops. The song peaked at number 8 on the UK Singles Chart, ultimately spending eleven weeks on the chart. It was Dave Dee, Dozy, Beaky, Mick & Tich's final top ten single.

Reception and legacy
The song received praise from Peter Jones of Record Mirror, who noted "the constant switching of style that keeps this group right there at the top". Chris Welch of Melody Maker considered the song not as commercial as "The Legend of Xanadu", deeming it "well away from their usual gimmick-laden performances". Ray Davies, whose Kinks single "Days" was in the charts at the same time as "Last Night in Soho", declared in Disc and Music Echo'''s "Hit Talk" column "I don't like "Last Night in Soho". "Xanadu" was not a favourite of mine and neither is this". Interviewed for the Melody Maker column "Blind Date", The Who's Keith Moon commented "I prefer this to the Hungarian Beer Chants they usually do".

Following the single's success, Dave Dee expressed his wish to become an actor, telling Disc and Music Echo "it's okay to keep turning out hits, but it reaches the point where you have nothing particular to aim for. If you have no
challenge life becomes very dull and boring and you end up making duff records". Dee left the band over a year later in September 1969 and appeared in the 1970 comedy film Every Home Should Have One starring Marty Feldman. 

Having heard "Hold Tight", a 1966 hit single for Dave Dee, Dozy, Beaky, Mick & Tich, used in the Quentin Tarantino film Death Proof'', film director Edgar Wright came upon "Last Night in Soho". His 2021 psychological horror film is named after the song. The song plays over the film's end credits.

Charts

References

1968 singles
Songs written by Ken Howard (composer)
Songs written by Alan Blaikley
1968 songs
Fontana Records singles
Song recordings produced by Steve Rowland